Brzostek is a town in south-eastern Poland.

Brzostek may also refer to the following villages:
Brzostek, Greater Poland Voivodeship (west-central Poland)
Brzostek, Łódź Voivodeship (central Poland)
Brzostek, Silesian Voivodeship (south Poland)